Bushiribana and Balashi are the sites of two former gold smelters on the Caribbean island of Aruba.

Bushiribana 
The Aruba Island Gold Mining Company built the Bushiribana smelter in 1825  to extract gold from the ore that was being mined in the nearby hills of Ceru Plat; it operated for ten years. Today, its remains are a stopping-off point for tourists on their way to view the Aruba Natural Bridge, which collapsed on September 2, 2005.

Balashi 

In 1899, the Aruba Gold Concessions Company built a gold smelter at Balashi, at the southern end of Frenchman's Pass. In 1916 during the First World War, it closed for lack of raw materials and spare parts, as most of them came from Germany.

In 1933, a sea water desalination plant was constructed at Balashi.

References 

Buildings and structures in Aruba
History of Aruba
Gold mining